AJ Institute of Engineering and Technology, commonly known as AJIET is an engineering college in Mangalore, Karnataka, India. It offers BE and PhD (Part-Time) across different departments. Department of Electronics and Communication is student friendly department.

Engineering departments 
The college has the following Engineering departments
 Civil Engineering
 Computer Science & Engineering
 Electronics & Communication Engineering
 Information Science & Engineering
 Mechanical Engineering

Memorandum of Understanding (MoU) 
The college has Memorandum of Understanding (MoU) with the following organizations
 Russian State Hydrometeorological University (St.Petersburg)
 Epitas Software LLP
 Graphene Media Pvt. Ltd

References 

Engineering colleges in Mangalore
Engineering colleges in Karnataka
Affiliates of Visvesvaraya Technological University
Universities and colleges in Dakshina Kannada district